Duck Quacks Don't Echo is an American television comedy panel game show that was aired in 2014 on the on National Geographic Channel, presented by comedian Tom Papa with co-hosts Michael Ian Black and Seth Herzog. The premise was derived from the British series of the same name.

Premise
In each episode, each host presents an unusual fact. Some facts are explained via video segments, while others are tested on-stage. At the end of the show, the audience votes for the best fact and the winner gets the Golden Quack award.

Episodes

Season 1

References

External links

National Geographic (American TV channel) original programming
2010s American game shows